Sarthe is a department of the French region of Pays de la Loire, and the province of Maine, situated in the Grand-Ouest of the country. It is named after the river Sarthe, which flows from east of Le Mans to just north of Angers. It had a population of 566,412 in 2019.

History 
In the late 18th century, before it was officially Sarthe, the nobility built their Mansions and Chateaux there, as an escape from Paris.

The department was created during the French Revolution on 4 March 1790, pursuant to the law of 22 December 1789, starting from a part of the province of Maine. The latter was divided into two departments, Sarthe to the east and Mayenne to the west.

In Roman times, this province contained the city of Mans, and many of its ruins are still standing. The Roman Thermal Bathhouse attracts many tourists, as does the Theater of Aubigné-Racan, both located on the outskirts of Anjou, Maine, and Touraine.

Marin Mersenne, perhaps the most important scientific figure in the early 17th century, was born in the vicinity of Sarthe.

Geography 
The department of Sarthe is at the north end of the administrative region of Pays de la Loire. It is south of Normandy and on the southern edge of the Armorican Massif. It is bordered by the departments of Orne, Eure-et-Loir, Loir-et-Cher, Indre-et-Loire, Maine-et-Loire and Mayenne.

The arrival of the railways in 1854 boosted trade for the local economy. A TGV connection was constructed in 1989, connecting the community to high-speed transport. In terms of road connections, the A11 autoroute, which was constructed to Le Mans from the east in 1978, enhances Sarthe's strategic position as the gateway to the French west.

Principal towns

The most populous commune is Le Mans, the prefecture. Approximately 370,000 people, comprising 65% of the department's population, live in the Le Mans urban area. The rest of the department retains a rural character, with agriculture as the chief part of the economy. As of 2019, there are 4 communes with more than 10,000 inhabitants:

Demographics 
Population development since 1801:

Politics

The department was the electoral base of former Prime Minister François Fillon, who since 2012 sits in the National Assembly of France for a constituency in central Paris. The president of the Departmental Council is Dominique Le Mèner, elected in 2015.

Presidential elections 2nd round

Current National Assembly Representatives

Tourism

See also 
 Arrondissements of the Sarthe department
 Cantons of the Sarthe department
 Circuit de la Sarthe (cycling), an annual road cycling race
 Circuit de la Sarthe, a motor racing track
 Communes of the Sarthe department

References

External links

 Prefecture 
 Departmental Council 
 Sarthe information 

 
1790 establishments in France
Departments of Pays de la Loire
States and territories established in 1790